Jamie Lamb (born 13 April 1968) is a former Australian rules footballer who played with St Kilda and Geelong in the Victorian/Australian Football League (VFL/AFL).

Lamb never played more than half a season at St Kilda, the most appearances he made was 10 games in 1989.  One of his best performances came in a win over the Sydney Swans in 1990, at Moorabbin Oval, where he had a career best 29 disposals and kicked three goals. He joined Geelong via the 1991 Pre-Season Draft and took part in their 1991 finals campaign. His three finals that year included the preliminary final loss to the West Coast Eagles.

References

1968 births
Living people
Australian rules footballers from Victoria (Australia)
St Kilda Football Club players
Geelong Football Club players